Fara San Martino (locally La Fàrë) is a comune and town in the Province of Chieti in the Abruzzo region of Italy. Situated on the outskirts of the Majella National Park, in Abruzzo, the town is known as ‘La capitale della Pasta” (The Capital of Pasta).

See also
Abbey of San Martino in Valle

References

 
Cities and towns in Abruzzo